Ross Thorne (born 7 November 1957) is a former Australian professional squash player.

Thorne was born on 7 November 1957 and lived in Queensland. He married Rhonda Shapland who was crowned world champion in 1981. Ross was a world's top ten player and represented Australia in the 1979, 1981, 1983 & 1985 World Team Squash Championships.
Thorne was named the player-manager of the Australian team during the 1987 Men's World Team Squash Championships.

References

External links
 

Australian male squash players
1957 births
Living people
20th-century Australian people
21st-century Australian people